Governor Bartlett may refer to:

Dewey F. Bartlett (1919–1979), 19th Governor of Oklahoma
John H. Bartlett (1869–1952), 57th Governor of New Hampshire
Josiah Bartlett (1729–1795), 4th Governor of New Hampshire
Washington Bartlett (1824–1887), 16th Governor of California

See also
 Josiah Bartlet, fictional former Governor of New Hampshire on the TV series, The West Wing